Brett, Boyd and Bosanquet were a partnership of British architects, known particularly for their post-war church designs in southern England.

The founders were Lionel Brett (1963–2004), Kenneth Boyd and Peter Bosanquet (died 2005).

Brett and Boyd also collaborated on two New Towns: Hatfield and the Ghyllgrove estate in Basildon.

Churches

Christ the King, Sonning Common
Church of St George, Letchworth (Grade II listed)
St John the Evangelist, Hatfield
St Matthew's, Wigmore

References

Architecture firms of England
Modernist architects from England